Figline e Incisa Valdarno is a comune (municipality) in the Metropolitan City of Florence in the Italian region Tuscany, located about  southeast of Florence.

It has been created on January 1, 2014 with the union of the municipalities of Figline Valdarno and Incisa in Val d'Arno.

References

Cities and towns in Tuscany